Darren Hughes (born 1978) is a New Zealand politician.

Darren Hughes may also refer to:

 Darren Hughes (English footballer) (born 1965), English footballer
 Darren Hughes (Gaelic footballer), Irish footballer
 Darren Hughes (gridiron football) (born 1967), American player of gridiron football

See also  
 Hughes (surname)